Gülşah Hatun ("Rose of the Şah"; died  1487) was a consort of Sultan Mehmed the Conqueror of the Ottoman Empire.

Early years
She married Mehmed in 1449, when he was still a prince and the governor of Manisa. Just before Sultan Murad II's death, she gave birth to her only son, Şehzade Mustafa, who was to be his father's favourite. According to Turkish tradition, all princes were expected to work as provincial governors as a part of their training. Mustafa was sent to govern Konya and later Kayseri, and Gülşah accompanied him.

Mustafa's death 
Mustafa died in December 25, 1474  of natural causes. It was rumored that Mustafa had approached Mahmud Pasha's wife and thus making him the person behind Mustafa's murder. There are speculations that Gülşah Hatun may have been a party to the illicit relations between the prince and wife of Mahmud Pasha. The wife of Mahmud was Selçuk Hatun, sister of Hatice Hatun, the last consort of Mehmed II (father of Mustafa). Giovanni Maria Angiolello, a Venetian traveler, author of an important historical report on the Aq Qoyunlu and early Safavid Persia, who was in the service of Mustafa, and who with the rest of Mustafa's household accompanied the prince's cortege from his post his Kayseri to Bursa, where he was buried, denied any role for Mahmud Pasha in Mustafa's death; nevertheless Mehmed II had the man executed shortly thereafter.

Gülşah Hatun had not been informed of his death, and with the wagon with her dead son stopped outside the palace, she and the women of her train began to wail. Babinger wrote that Mustafa's daughter,  Nergiszade Ferahşad Hatun, shared her grandmother's grief, and the lamentations went on endlessly. Mehmed sent word that she should remain in Bursa with those maidens whom she required. Mehmed also had a good provision made for her, where she might live there honorably. He ordered that Mustafa's daughter and her mother and rest of the ladies together with all others belonging to the court of his deceased son should come to Istanbul. All the women were lodged in the palace where women of Mehmed's harem stayed, and after several days the maidens were married to courtiers. Nergiszade Ferahşad married her cousin Şehzade Abdullah, eldest son of Şehzade Bayezid (future Bayezid II) in 1480.

Issue
By Mehmed II, Gülşah had a son:
Şehzade Mustafa (1450 - December 25, 1474). Sanjakbey of Konya, he had a son, Şehzade Hali, and a daughter, Nergiszade Ferahşad Hatun, who married her cousin Şehzade Abdullah (son of Bayezid II). They had a son died young (1481-1489) and two daughters: Aynışah Sultan (b. 1482, married) and Şahnisa Sultan (b. 1484, who married her cousin Şehzade Mehmed Şah, son of Şehzade Şehinşah, son of Bayezid II)

Last years and death
In 1479, Gülşah Hatun was granted the village of Sığırcalu in Dimetoka, its revenues were converted into mülk so that Gülşah could turn it into an endowment for the eventual upkeep of her tomb in Bursa. Gülşah Hatun died in 1487, and was buried in Bursa in the tomb she had built for herself near that of Mustafa. The tomb of Gülşah Hatun has an entrance with elegant jogged voussoirs, and marble cenotaphs inside, newly made from old pieces.

References

Bibliography

15th-century consorts of Ottoman sultans
1433 births
1487 deaths
Mehmed the Conqueror
People from Bursa